Paso de Cortés is a mountain pass between the Popocatépetl and Iztaccihuatl volcanoes in central Mexico.

History
The name derives from the transit of conquistador Hernán Cortés and his men over the pass in 1519. After the battle of Cholula, the Spanish continued northwest into the Valley of Mexico and the city of Tenochtitlán to confront the Aztecs and their emperor Moctezuma. It is claimed that while crossing the pass, some of Cortés' men climbed Popocatépetl, lowered into the crater, and brought back sulphur for making gunpowder.

Access
There is a paved road from Amecameca on the Mexico City side to Paso de Cortés, and from there south to Tlamacas towards Popocatépetl or north to the area near the base of Iztaccihuatl. The pass can also be reached on dirt trails from Cholula, which are at least sometimes passable by 4-wheel-drive vehicles.

Mountain passes of Mexico
Trans-Mexican Volcanic Belt
History of Mexico
Landforms of the State of Mexico